William Smith Watt, FBA (20 June 1913  Harthill – 23 December 2002) was a British Latin scholar. 

He was  fellow and tutor in classics at  Balliol College from 1938 to 1952. He was Regius Professor of Humanity at the University of Aberdeen from 1952 to 1979.

References 

1913 births
2002 deaths
British classical scholars
Fellows of Balliol College, Oxford
Academics of the University of Aberdeen
Fellows of the British Academy